Dar Eshgaft-e Baba Bahram (also Romanized as Dar Eshgaft-e Bābā Bahrām) is a village in Malavi Rural District, in the Central District of Pol-e Dokhtar County, Lorestan Province, Iran. At the 2006 census, its population was 50, in 12 families.

References 

Towns and villages in Pol-e Dokhtar County